Mexic-Arte Museum is  a fine arts museum in Austin, Texas. The Mission of the organization is to enrich and educate the community through the presentation and promotion of traditional and contemporary Mexican, Latino, and Latino art and culture.

Founded in 1983 and incorporated in 1984, Mexic-Arte Museum is The Official Mexican American Fine Art Museum of Texas.  In 1988, the museum relocated to a new location on Congress Avenue in Austin.

In 2016, the Screen It! program was one of twelve awardees of the National Arts & Humanities Youth Program Awards.

References

External links

 Mexic-Arte Museum official site
 Photo slideshow of Mexic-Arte Museum mural
 2016 National Arts and Humanities Youth Program Awards

Hispanic and Latino American culture in Austin, Texas
Mexican-American culture in Texas
Museums in Austin, Texas
Art museums and galleries in Texas
Latino museums in the United States
Ethnic museums in Texas
1983 establishments in Texas
Art museums established in 1983